Operation Northwind was the last major German offensive of World War II on the Western Front. Northwind was launched to support the German Ardennes offensive campaign in the Battle of the Bulge, which by December 1944 had decisively turned against the German forces. It began on 31 December 1944 in Rhineland-Palatinate, Alsace and Lorraine in southwestern Germany and northeastern France, and ended on 25 January 1945. The German offensive was an operational failure, with its main objectives not achieved.

Objectives 

By 21 December 1944, the German momentum during the Battle of the Bulge had begun to dissipate, and it was evident that the operation was on the brink of failure. It was believed that an attack against the United States Seventh Army further south, which had extended its lines and taken on a defensive posture to cover the area vacated by the United States Third Army (which turned north to assist at the site of the German breakthrough), could relieve pressure on German forces in the Ardennes. In a briefing at his military command complex at Adlerhorst, Adolf Hitler declared in his speech to his division commanders on 28 December 1944 (three days prior to the launch of Operation Nordwind), "This attack has a very clear objective, namely the destruction of the enemy forces. There is not a matter of prestige involved here. It is a matter of destroying and exterminating the enemy forces wherever we find them."

The goal of the offensive was to break through the lines of the U.S. Seventh Army and French 1st Army in the Upper Vosges Mountains and the Alsatian Plain and destroy them, as well as seize Strasbourg, which Himmler had promised would be captured by 30 January. That would leave the way open for Operation Dentist (Unternehmen Zahnarzt), a planned major thrust into the rear of the U.S. Third Army, which would lead to the destruction of that army.

Offensive 

On 31 December 1944, German Army Group G—commanded by Generaloberst Johannes Blaskowitz—and Army Group Oberrhein ("Upper Rhine")—commanded by Reichsführer-SS Heinrich Himmler—launched a major offensive against the thinly stretched,  front line held by the U.S. 7th Army. Operation Nordwind soon had the overextended U.S. 7th Army in dire straits; the 7th Army—at the orders of U.S. General Dwight D. Eisenhower—had sent troops, equipment, and supplies north to reinforce the American armies in the Ardennes involved in the Battle of the Bulge.

On the same day that the German Army launched Operation Nordwind, the Luftwaffe (German Air Force) committed almost 1,000 aircraft in support. This attempt to cripple the Allied air forces based in northwestern Europe was known as Operation Bodenplatte. It failed without having achieved any of its key objectives.

The initial Nordwind attack was conducted by three corps of the German 1st Army of Army Group G, and by 9 January, the XXXIX (39th) Panzer Corps was heavily engaged as well. By 15 January at least 17 German divisions (including units in the Colmar Pocket) from Army Group G and Army Group Oberrhein, including the 6th SS Mountain, 17th SS Panzergrenadier, 21st Panzer, and 25th Panzergrenadier Divisions were engaged in the fighting. Another smaller attack was made against the French positions south of Strasbourg, but it was finally stopped. The U.S. VI Corps—which bore the brunt of the German attacks—was fighting on three sides by 15 January.

The 125th Regiment of the 21st Panzer Division under Colonel Hans von Luck aimed to sever the American supply line to Strasbourg, by cutting across the eastern foothills of the Vosges at the northwest base of a natural salient in a bend of the River Rhine. Here the Maginot Line, running east–west, was used by Allied forces, and "showed what a superb fortification it was". On January 7 Luck approached the line south of Wissembourg at the villages of Rittershoffen and Hatten. Heavy American fire came from the 79th Infantry Division, the 14th Armoured Division, plus elements of the 42nd Infantry Division. On January 10 Luck reached the villages. Two weeks of heavy fighting followed, Germans and Americans each occupying parts of the villages while civilians sheltered in cellars. Luck later said that the fighting around Rittershoffen had been "one of the hardest and most costly battles that ever raged".

But their arrival was delayed, and on 21 January with supplies and ammunition short, Seventh Army ordered the much-depleted 79th Infantry and 14th Armored Divisions to retreat from Rittershoffen and fall back on new positions on the south bank of the Moder River.

On 25 January the German offensive was halted, after the US 222nd Infantry Regiment stopped their advance near Haguenau, earning the Presidential Unit Citation in the process. This was the same day that the reinforcements began to arrive from the Ardennes. Strasbourg was saved, but the Colmar Pocket was a danger which still had to be eliminated.

See also 
 Operation Spring Awakening

References

Citations

Bibliography 

 
 Bonn, Keith E. When the Odds Were Even: The Vosges Mountains Campaign, October 1944 – January 1945. Novato, CA: Presidio, 2006. 
 Engler, Richard. The Final Crisis: Combat in Northern Alsace, January 1945. Aberjona Press. 1999. 
 Nordwind & the US 44th Division *Battle History of the 44th I.D.

External links 
 
 The NORDWIND Offensive (January 1945) on the website of the 100th Infantry Division Association contains a list of German primary sources on the operation.

Battle of the Bulge
Battles of World War II involving France
Battles of World War II involving the United States
Battles in Rhineland-Palatinate
Battles in Grand Est
History of Bas-Rhin
History of Haut-Rhin
History of Moselle (department)
December 1944 events
Heinrich Himmler
January 1945 events in Europe
Western European Campaign (1944–1945)